Olmaz Olsun Is a Turkish folkloric tune. The English translation of the title is "May not be".

Structure and Content 
Turkish music and lyrics are by Şanar Yurdatapan.

Related Dances and Songs 
Olmaz Olsun is related to the Greek folk dance hasaposerviko. There are similar folkloric tunes known as "Eche Geia Panagia ".

Versions of the Song
Galatasaray S.K. (football): Gerçekleri Tarih Yazar

See also
Hava Nagila
Hopak
Sirmpa
Külhanlı
Arabaci
Mangiko

References

Turkish music
Turkish songs